Tungrymbai or tung rymbái or "tungtoh" is a fermented soybean food traditionally prepared by the Khasi and Jaiñtia peoples of Meghalaya, Northeast India.

Production 
The soybeans are washed then boiled until they are soft. After boiling, the excess water is drained off and the beans are left to cool. The beans are then transferred to a bamboo basket lined with fresh slamet (Phrynium pubinerve) leaves. The leaves are then wrapped over the beans and hot charcoal is placed on top before more leaves are wrapped over once again. The entire basket is then placed inside a jute bag to ferment for three to four days by a fireplace.

Preparation 
Tungrymbai is usually prepared by crushing the fermented beans until it almost becomes a paste and fried in mustard oil with onion-ginger-garlic paste, black sesame seed paste, aromatics and pork.

References 

Fermented soy-based foods
Khasi people
Indian legume dishes
Meghalayan cuisine